is a railway station in the city of Tsuruoka, Yamagata, Japan, operated by East Japan Railway Company (JR East).

Lines
Kobato Station is served by the Uetsu Main Line, and is located   rail kilometers from the terminus of the line at Niitsu Station.

Station layout

Kobato Station has two opposed side platforms serving two tracks. The platforms are connected by an underground passageway. The station is unattended.

Platforms

History
Kobato Station opened on February 1, 1950. With the privatization of JNR on April 1, 1987, the station came under the control of JR East.

Surrounding area
The station is located in a rural area, with no residential or commercial buildings in the vicinity.

See also
List of railway stations in Japan

References

External links

 JR East Station information 

Stations of East Japan Railway Company
Railway stations in Yamagata Prefecture
Uetsu Main Line
Railway stations in Japan opened in 1950
Tsuruoka, Yamagata